"First Time" is a song recorded by Canadian singer Carly Rae Jepsen for her second remix album, Emotion Remixed + (2016), which was released only in Japan. The song is also included on  Emotion: Side B.

Live performances
On April 2, 2016, Jepsen performed this song in the Japanese music festival "Popspring 2016" for the first time.

Music video
The lyric video was uploaded on YouTube, which can be watched exclusively in Japan.

Chart performance
"First Time" peaked on the Billboard Japan Hot 100 Chart at No. 71 and became her fifth highest ranked song on the chart, behind "Call Me Maybe", "I Really Like You", "Good Time" and "This Kiss". It also peaked on the Billboard Japan Hot Overseas at No. 8 and Billboard Japan Radio Songs Chart at No. 9.

Charts

References

2016 singles
2016 songs
Carly Rae Jepsen songs
Funk songs
Songs written by Carly Rae Jepsen
Songs written by Carl Falk
Songs written by Wayne Hector
Songs written by Rami Yacoub
604 Records singles